Kikihia muta, commonly known as the variable cicada, is a species of cicada that is endemic to New Zealand. This species was first described by Johan Christian Fabricius in 1775.

Life Cycle
Their median life cycle from egg to natural adult death is around three years.

Subspecies
There are two subspecies:
 Kikihia muta muta (Fabricius, 1775)
 Kikihia muta pallida (Hudson, 1950)

References

Cicadas of New Zealand
Insects described in 1775
Endemic fauna of New Zealand
Taxa named by Johan Christian Fabricius
Cicadettini
Endemic insects of New Zealand